Reseda Beach (originally known or dubbed as Rocket Surgery) is Los Angeles underground rap group Styles of Beyond's third studio album, as well as their fourth project, released on Dirty Version Records in 2012 after their 2007 installment Razor Tag. Reseda Beach was digitally released on October 23, 2012 that is available on iTunes. The album was produced by Fort Minor rapper and Linkin Park co-vocalist Mike Shinoda. In every digital version of the album (except in Amazon), there's a bonus track for disc 2 named "Godz in the Front", also from Razor Tag and taken from the second volume of Apathy's compilation album collection It's the Bootleg, Muthafuckas!.

Background and promotion
This is the last known effort by Ryu for any group. Before this took place, he was with rap duo Get Busy Committee which was the featuring artist with Shinoda on the track "SUICIDE.MUSIC" for Shinoda's collaborated soundtrack/score, The Raid: Redemption with Joseph Trapanese. Ryu alone acted as featuring artist later. His latest work was with American rock band Linkin Park on their second remix album Recharged for the track "Skin to Bone (Nick Catchdubs Remix)", which also features Cody B. Ware. The album acts as a studio album for the group. but in the long form it also acts a greatest hits/compilation album, due to its features of many songs, which were included in their previous installments, and some which were not released as a track in the albums but as a bonus track or a limited edition track. Whereas the album also includes new songs by the group. The album includes whole Ryu's raps from S.O.B. except from "Second to None", which has Tak's second verse in it. This is why it was released as single from the album digitally from the Demigodz stores, but was later taken off of them.

The album was not well promoted but Shinoda made an appeal to his fans to hear the album by the medium of Twitter and his official website.

Reception

The album was critically very successful. In the review by RapReviews, the album was explained as, "To be fair, I'm not sure whether to be happy or bummed out that there's a J. Dilla track called "Hard" on this album. The track is unquestionably dope, and as many delays as there have been in S.O.B.'s career, it's not hard to believe this song dates back to when he was still alive - not a Johnny-come-lately buying one of his cataloged beats long after his demise. In fact it's so good that it probably should have come out years ago as a single - not that it necessarily would have gone mainstream but every underground mixtape and club DJ would have been bumping the shit anyway. Ultimately I give up trying to date this material though because songs like the Skully and Cheapshot collaboration for "Sugar Honey Iced Tea" is dope in 1999, 2005 or 2012 - take your pick. Let's not point fingers at these Cali rappers for slacking on their discography, Shinoda for not promoting them when they were under his thumb, or the industry as a whole for not finding a place for them when they were so hot. Let's just be glad 'Reseda Beach' finally came out and no longer matter how long the wait. It was worth it."

Track listing

Credits
Styles of Beyond
 Ryu (Ryan Maginn) - vocals
 Tak (Takbir Bashir) - vocals
 DJ Cheapshot - turntables
 Vin Skully - producer

Additional credits
 Mike Shinoda - additional vocals, producer
 Apathy - additional vocals, producer
 Open Mic - graphics
 Chris Barnett - management
 J Dilla - producer
 Scoop DeVille - additional vocals, producer

References

Styles of Beyond albums
2012 albums